Weinbrecht is a surname. Notable people with the surname include:

 Donna Weinbrecht (born 1965), American freestyle skier
 Harold Weinbrecht (born 1956), American politician

See also
 Weitbrecht, surname